Fredrik Andersson Hed (20 January 1972 – 24 October 2021) was a Swedish professional golfer and broadcaster. He won the 2010 BMW Italian Open.

Early life
Andersson Hed was born in Halmstad on 20 January 1972. He began playing golf when he was ten years old and turned professional in 1992.

Career
Andersson Hed won his first title on the Challenge Tour only a year after turning pro at the inaugural Danish PGA Championship. He later won the Challenge de France held in Le Touquet in 2003. However, he found success hard to come by on the main European Tour, where he had to return to qualifying school on numerous occasions.

Andersson Hed won his first European Tour title at the 2010 BMW Italian Open at Royal Park, outside Turin, on his 245th attempt. Two weeks later, he finished tied in second place, with Luke Donald, at the European Tour's flagship event, the 2010 BMW PGA Championship at Wentworth Club. He finished one shot behind winner Simon Khan. 2010 was ultimately his best year on the European Tour, when he finished 22nd on the Order of Merit.

Andersson Hed was also runner-up another five times on the European Tour, at the 2003 Madeira Island Open, 2007 Valle Romano Open de Andalucia, 2011 Barclays Scottish Open, 2012 UBS Hong Kong Open and 2012 Omega European Masters. He missed the cut at the European Tour Qualifying School in November 2015 by one stroke, and subsequently retired from professional golf. He became a golf commentator for the national public broadcaster Sveriges Television the following year.

Personal life
Andersson Hed married Anna Hed in 2004, and consequently added her surname to his name. He had been known as Fredrik Andersson until then. Together, they had two children; Viggo and Molly.

Andersson Hed died on 24 October 2021, with his death being announced by the European Tour. He was 49, and suffered from cancer prior to his death.

Amateur wins
1990 Swedish Junior Stroke-play Championship
1990 European Young Masters

Professional wins (3)

European Tour wins (1)

Source:

Challenge Tour wins (2)

Challenge Tour playoff record (1–0)

Sources:

Results in major championships

CUT = missed the half-way cut
"T" = tied
Note: Andersson Hed never played in the Masters Tournament or the U.S. Open.
Source:

Team appearances
Amateur
European Amateur Team Championship (representing Sweden): 1991
European Youths' Team Championship (representing Sweden): 1992 (winners)
Eisenhower Trophy (representing Sweden): 1992
St Andrews Trophy (representing the Continent of Europe): 1992

Professional
Royal Trophy (representing Europe): 2011 (winners)

See also
2006 European Tour Qualifying School graduates
2009 European Tour Qualifying School graduates

References

External links

Swedish male golfers
European Tour golfers
Sportspeople from Halland County
Sportspeople from Halmstad
Deaths from cancer in Sweden
1972 births
2021 deaths
20th-century Swedish people